HD 79917 is a single star in the southern constellation of Vela. It has the Bayer designation l (lowercase L) Velorum, while HD 79917 is the star's identifier from the Henry Draper Catalogue. The star has an orange hue and is faintly visible to the naked eye with an apparent visual magnitude of +4.92. It is located at a distance of approximately 228 light-years from the Sun based on parallax, and is drifting further away with a radial velocity of +1.6 km/s.

This is an aging giant star with a stellar classification of K1III, having exhausted is core hydrogen then cooled and expanded off the main sequence.

References 

K-type giants
Vela (constellation)
Velorum, l
Durchmusterung objects
079917
045439
3682